Kemperi is a village in Khashuri Municipality of Shida Kartli region in Georgia. According to the 2014 census it had a population of 350.

See also
 Shida Kartli

Bibliography 
 Georgian Soviet Encyclopedia, X, p. 501, Tbilisi, 1985

References 

Populated places in Shida Kartli